Fantome class may refer to:

 , used by the Royal Navy 1873–1911
 , used in Australia